Wineham  is a hamlet mainly in the Shermanbury civil parish (and the same ecclesiastical parish) of the Horsham district of West Sussex, England. Historically called Wyndham the settlement has one public house, the Royal Oak.

At Wyndham, usually called Wineham in the 20th century perhaps by assimilation to neighbouring Twineham, the houses are strung out on both sides of the road but mostly on the west, those on the east being in Twineham parish. The hospital had a church and a graveyard, and was presumably the place in Wyndham where an inquisition was held in about 1300.

Wyndham Pool, Wineham, is a small house of the late 16th century with a smoke bay into which a chimney was later built.

References

External links

Horsham District
Villages in West Sussex